Typhoon Lekima was the second most intense tropical cyclone worldwide in 2013, as well as the twenty-ninth named storm and the eleventh typhoon of the annual typhoon season. It developed into a tropical storm late on October 20. After Lekima intensified into a typhoon and underwent rapid deepening in a very favorable environment on October 22, the system reached peak intensity on the following day. Maintaining its strength for over one day, Lekima began to weaken on October 24, as stronger vertical wind shear and mid-latitude westerlies began to make the typhoon significantly decay. On October 26, Lekima transitioned into an extratropical cyclone east of Japan.

Despite its violent strength, Lekima caused minimal damage because it did not affect populated places.

Meteorological history

During that day as the system moved slowly westwards, upper level divergence helped to offset the vertical windshear and enhanced the atmospheric convection surrounding the system. As a result of this increase in convection and a consolidating low level circulation centre, the United States Joint Typhoon Warning Center issued a tropical cyclone formation alert on the system later that day. During October 20, the system continued to develop as it moved around the outer edge of a low level reflection of the subtropical ridge of high pressure. Later that day the JTWC initiated advisories on the system and designated it as Tropical Depression 22W, before the JMA named the system Lekima at 1800 UTC after it had developed into a tropical storm. Early on October 21, JMA upgraded Lekima to a severe tropical storm. Although a weak trough east of the cyclone was causing subsidence, vigorous eastward and equatorward outflow were helping sustain the convection. Late on the same day, JTWC upgraded Lekima to a typhoon.

After JMA upgraded Lekima to a typhoon early on October 22, the system began to undergo rapid deepening, developing a well-defined eye with a symmetric eyewall and further improved deep convective banding owing to weak vertical wind shear and radial outflow. When Lekima was tracking along the southwestern periphery of a deep-layered subtropical ridge late on the same day, JTWC upgraded the system to a super typhoon with category 5 strength on the Saffir–Simpson hurricane wind scale, as an anticyclone was providing very favourable dual-channel outflow. Since then, the typhoon has maintained its peak intensity for over one day, with a larger and sharply defined eye surrounded by a thick eyewall of deep convection. However, morphed integrated microwave imageries at CIMSS (MIMIC) depict that Lekima underwent an eyewall replacement cycle late on October 23 and completed it one day later.

As Lekima began to approach mid-latitude westerlies and stronger vertical wind shear, JMA reported that the typhoon north of the Northern Mariana Islands started to slowly weaken at noon on October 24, yet JTWC analysed it had weakened earlier. JTWC best track data indicated that Lekima weakened into a typhoon at noon, for elongation becoming evident along the northern flank. On October 25, when Lekima was located east of the Bonin Islands, it crested the western periphery of the subtropical ridge and was poised to accelerate northeastwards. Meanwhile, a point source anticyclone continued to provide favorable radial outflow, but convection became more shallow over the system. Under moderate to strong westerly vertical wind shear and interacting with the mid-latitude westerlies in the afternoon, Lekima has begun extratropical transition; as the result, the typhoon lost the eyewall structure, but it still maintained tightly curved banding wrapping into a well-defined centre.

Early on October 26, the low-level circulation centre became partially exposed, positioning along the western edge of the deep convection. JMA later depicted that a warm front had formed over the eastern side of Typhoon Lekima, as well as JTWC issued a final warning to the system. At noon, Lekima completed its extratropical transition east of Japan, having weakened into a storm-force developed low. After crossing the International Date Line on October 28, the system was absorbed by another developing low on October 30.

Impact
The western rain-bands of Lekima passed through the northern part of the Northern Mariana Islands on October 24 and later the Bonin Islands on October 25. Although JMA even issued gale and storm surge warnings over the Ogasawara Islands, there is no damage from the typhoon in the islands.

See also

Typhoon Keith
Typhoon Nida (2009)
Typhoon Dolphin (2015)
Typhoon Nuri (2014)

References

External links

JMA General Information of Typhoon Lekima (1328) from Digital Typhoon
JMA Best Track Data of Typhoon Lekima (1328) 
JTWC Best Track Data of Super Typhoon 28W (Lekima)
28W.LEKIMA from the U.S. Naval Research Laboratory

2013 Pacific typhoon season
Typhoons
Lekima